Yes! is the second studio album by American country music artist Chad Brock, released on May 2, 2000. Lead-off single "A Country Boy Can Survive (Y2K Version)", featuring George Jones and Hank Williams, Jr., is a rewritten version of Williams' hit "A Country Boy Can Survive", rewritten to address the Y2K problem. This song peaked at #30 on the country charts in late 1999. Following it were the title track, which became Brock's only Number One hit in mid-2000, and finally "The Visit" at #21.

Track listing

Personnel
From Yes! liner notes.

Eddie Bayers - drums (tracks 1, 2)
Chad Brock - lead vocals (all tracks)
Pat Buchanan - electric guitar (tracks 3, 7, 9)
Melanie Cannon - background vocals (tracks 3, 4)
J.T. Corenflos - electric guitar (tracks 1, 2, 4, 5, 6, 8)
Eric Darken - percussion (track 6)
Dan Dugmore - banjo (track 3), steel guitar (tracks 3, 7, 9, 10), lap steel guitar (track 9)
Sonny Garrish - steel guitar (1, 2, 4, 5, 6, 8)
Rob Hajacos - fiddle (all tracks)
Ted Hewitt - background vocals (3, 4, 6)
Wes Hightower - background vocals (track 6)
John Hobbs - B-3 organ (tracks 5, 9), keyboards (tracks 4, 10), piano (tracks 3, 6, 7, 8, 9, 10), percussion (track 5)
George Jones - featured vocals (track 9)
John Jorgenson - electric guitar (track 6)
Paul Leim - drums (all tracks except 1 and 2), percussion (tracks 4, 5), tambourine (track 3)
B. James Lowry - acoustic guitar (all tracks), electric guitar (track 1)
Mark Luna - background vocals (tracks 1, 7)
Liana Manis - background vocals (tracks 2, 5, 8)
Randy McCormick - B-3 organ (tracks 1, 2, 6, 8), keyboards (tracks 1, 2, 8, 9), piano (tracks 4, 5)
Terry McMillan - harmonica (tracks 4, 9), percussion (tracks 8, 9)
Larry Paxton - bass guitar (all tracks), tic-tac bass (track 3)
Gary Prim - piano (tracks 1, 2)
John Wesley Ryles - background vocals (tracks 2, 5, 8)
Stephony Smith - background vocals (tracks 1, 7)
Hank Williams Jr. - featured vocals (track 9)
John Willis - 12-string electric guitar (track 8), electric guitar (tracks 1, 4, 6)
Mark Wills - features vocals (track 10)
Dennis Wilson - background vocals (tracks 2, 5, 8)

Chart performance

References

2000 albums
Chad Brock albums
Warner Records albums
Albums produced by Buddy Cannon
Albums produced by Norro Wilson